Tony Jordan (born 21 July 1957) is a British television writer. He was listed as the number one television screenwriter in the United Kingdom by Broadcast magazine in 2008 and among British broadcasting's top twenty in The Stage in 2009.

For many years, Jordan was lead writer and series consultant for BBC One soap opera EastEnders. Jordan had written for the programme since 1989 including the 2008 single-hander "Pretty Baby...." and is considered to be an 'elder statesman' of the show, for which he has written over 250 episodes .

Career
Beginning his career as a market trader, Jordan began writing at the age of thirty-two. He joined EastEnders after sending a spec script to the BBC about market traders, with a covering letter saying he had been born and raised in the East End of London. The BBC turned down the spec script, but gave him a job on EastEnders because of his apparent life experience. Afraid of what would happen if the producers found out that he was from the north, Jordan kept up the pretence of being a Londoner for five years.

Jordan left school with no qualifications. For his work on EastEnders, he is particularly known for creating the Slater family along with then producer, John Yorke. Amongst significant episodes he scripted are those featuring the deaths of Arthur Fowler and Ethel Skinner; the "Sharongate" storyline; and more recently Kat's revelation to Zoe that she was her mother, the Andy-Kat-Alfie love triangle, and Dot's monologue. He was the first writer to do EastEnders when it began airing three times a week, when the siege at The Queen Victoria took place in 1994. He continued to work on EastEnders through a period which saw a reversal in its hitherto declining fortunes, with the programme winning the Most Popular Soap category at the National Television Awards in 2005. He wrote the first two episodes (broadcast on 24 and 25 October 2005) for the return of the characters of Phil and Grant Mitchell, popular characters he had originally helped to create back in 1989.

While on staff at EastEnders, Jordan undertook a number of freelance projects. In early 2004, he created hit BBC One con artist drama Hustle. He also co-created the time travel/police drama Life on Mars, which began in 2006.

His other credits include; Boon (ITV), Minder (ITV), Trainer (BBC), Eldorado (BBC), Thief Takers (ITV), Where the Heart Is (ITV), City Central (BBC), April Fool's Day (ITV), Can't Buy Me Love (ITV), The Vanishing Man (ITV), Perfectly Frank (BBC) Sunburn (BBC), HolbyBlue (BBC), Moving Wallpaper (ITV), Echo Beach (ITV).

In January 2007, Jordan's departure from EastEnders was announced, as it was his plan to concentrate on running his own new production company, Red Planet Pictures, backed by leading independent producer Kudos Film & Television. HolbyBlue, a new BBC One police drama, spun off from the channel's successful medical drama Holby City debuted in May 2007, quickly being recommissioned for a second run.

Jordan also created the series of Moving Wallpaper and Echo Beach for ITV; these were linked to each other, the latter being a soap opera and the former being a sitcom about the production of that soap opera.

In 2007, Jordan was honoured for his work on EastEnders at the British Soap Awards with a "Special Achievement award". On 14 November 2007, it was announced that Jordan would be returning to EastEnders less than twelve months after quitting, to write one final episode. Jordan subsequently wrote the script for Dot Branning's single-handed episode, broadcast on 31 January 2008 on BBC One. Ten years later John Yorke asked him to write Kat Moon's return to EastEnders in March 2018 and he wrote the second episode that aired on 22 March under a pseudonym, Harry Holmes.

In 2008, he worked on Hustle and zombie drama Renaissance, starring Kelly Brook and Alan Dale. As Head of Red Planet Pictures, he is also creating new formats for the UK and US markets.

His latest work as a writer was The Nativity, a new BBC version of the nativity of Jesus story starring Peter Capaldi, broadcast in December 2010. Jordan states he had always had a faith but it was during this work that he became convinced that Jesus who was born in this way is the Son of God and that the Nativity story is a 'true story' and a 'thing of beauty'.

In 2013 Jordan wrote By Any Means and The Passing-Bells, and in 2015 he wrote Dickensian''.

See also
Crash (2009 TV series)

References

External links
EastEnders website

 Tony Jordan profile at BBC Wales

1957 births
Living people
People from Southport
British television writers
British television producers
British soap opera writers
English television writers
English screenwriters
English male screenwriters
English soap opera writers
British male television writers